Trichogomphus  is a genus of Asian beetles in the family Scarabaeidae and tribe Oryctini.

Species 
BioLib lists:
 Trichogomphus acuticollis Arrow, 1908
 Trichogomphus bronchus (Herbst, 1785)type species (as Scarabaeus milo Olivier, 1789)
 Trichogomphus dechambrei Dupuis, 2003
 Trichogomphus excavatus Mohnike, 1874
 Trichogomphus galeatus Dechambre, 1996
 Trichogomphus kobayashii Yamaya, 2002
 Trichogomphus lunicollis Burmeister, 1847
 Trichogomphus martabani (Guérin-Ménéville, 1834)
 Trichogomphus mongol Arrow, 1908
 Trichogomphus pistiloides Voirin, 1996
 Trichogomphus quadridentatus Dechambre, 1981
 Trichogomphus robustus Arrow, 1930
 Trichogomphus rongi Dechambre & Drumont, 2002
 Trichogomphus simson Snellen van Vollenhoven, 1864
 Trichogomphus vicinus Dechambre, 1995
 Trichogomphus zangi Sternberg, 1907

References

External links
 
 

Scarabaeidae genera
Beetles of Asia
Dynastinae